Kenworth Historic District is a national historic district located at Hickory, Catawba County, North Carolina. The district encompasses 52 contributing buildings and 2 contributing structures in the planned subdivision of Kenworth in Hickory. Most of the buildings date between the early- and mid-20th century and include notable examples of Colonial Revival and Bungalow / American Craftsman style architecture. Notable buildings include the (former) Christ Lutheran Church (1926), Kenworth Elementary School (1913), Frederick O. Bock House (1923), Nichelson-Abernethy House (1922), Speas-Duval House (1921), Clyde L. Herman House (c. 1922), Kennedy-Setzer House (1921), and Payne-Bothwell-Scheller House (1921).

It was added to the National Register of Historic Places in 1985, with a boundary increase in 2005.

References

Historic districts on the National Register of Historic Places in North Carolina
Neoclassical architecture in North Carolina
Buildings and structures in Catawba County, North Carolina
National Register of Historic Places in Catawba County, North Carolina